Fortino Hipólito Vera (1834–1898) was a Mexican Catholic bishop, born in Santiago Tequixquiac, Mexico. He was the first bishop of Cuernavaca, Mexico. He was a writer and defender of the apparitions of the Virgin of Guadalupe. His collection of related documents is an important source for scholars studying the Guadalupe tradition.

Publications 
 Apuntamientos históricos de los concilios provinciales mexicanos y privilegios de América. Estudios previous al Primer Concilio Provincial de Antequera.
 Biografía del Ilmo
 Señor Alcaldo
 Historia del primer concilio de Antequera
 Contestación histórico crítica en defensa de la maravillosa aparición de la Santísima Virgen de Guadalupe, al anónimo intitulado Exquisitio Historica y a otro anónimo también que se dice Libro de Sensación
 Tesoro Guadalupano, Noticia de los Libros, Documentos, Inscripciones, que tratan, mencionan o aluden a la Aparición y Devoción de Nuestra Señora de Guadalupe
 Catecismo geográfico-histórico-estadístico de la iglesia mexicana
 Colección de documentos eclesiásticos de México : o sea Antigua y moderna legislación de la Iglesia mexicana
 Escritores eclesiásticos de México, o bibliografía histórica eclesiástica mexicana
 Informaciones sobre la milagrosa aparición de la Santísima Virgen de Guadalupe, recibidas en 1666 y 1723
 Itinerario parroquial del Arzobispado de México y reseña histórica, geográfica y estadística de las Parroquias del mismo Arzobispado

References

External links
 en catholic-hierarchy.org Bishop Fortino Hipólito Vera y Talonia †

1834 births
1898 deaths
People from Tequixquiac
19th-century Roman Catholic bishops in Mexico